Coral Terrace is a suburban unincorporated community and census-designated place (CDP) in Miami-Dade County, Florida, United States. The population was 23,142 at the 2020 census, down from 24,376 in 2010.

Geography
It is bordered to the north by the Miami city limits, to the northeast by the city of West Miami, to the east by the city of Coral Gables, to the south by the city of South Miami and unincorporated Glenvar Heights, to the southwest by Olympia Heights, to the west by Westchester, and to the northwest by Fontainebleau, all unincorporated.

Florida State Road 826 (the Palmetto Expressway) forms the western border of Coral Terrace. U.S. Route 41 (SW 8th Street) forms the northern border with Miami, State Road 959 (S Red Road) forms the eastern border with Coral Gables, and State Road 976 (SW 40th Street) forms the southern border.

Demographics

2020 census

As of the 2020 United States census, there were 23,142 people, 7,468 households, and 6,039 families residing in the CDP.

2000 census
As of the census of 2000, there were 24,380 people, 7,744 households, and 6,171 families residing in the CDP. The racial makeup of the CDP was 93.06% White (16.5% were Non-Hispanic White,) 1.15% African American, 0.10% Native American, 0.53% Asian, 0.01% Pacific Islander, 2.84% from other races, and 2.31% from two or more races. Hispanic or Latino of any race were 82.10% of the population.

There were 7,744 households, out of which 29.3% had children under the age of 18 living with them, 58.3% were married couples living together, 15.6% had a female householder with no husband present, and 20.3% were non-families. 15.4% of all households were made up of individuals, and 8.1% had someone living alone who was 65 years of age or older. The average household size was 3.07, and the average family size was 3.30.

In the CDP, the population was spread out, with 20.3% under the age of 18, 6.7% from 18 to 24, 27.8% from 25 to 44, 24.6% from 45 to 64, and 20.6% who were 65 years of age or older. The median age was 41 years. For every 100 females, there were 89.6 males. For every 100 females age 18 and over, there were 85.2 males.

The median income for a household in the CDP was $38,523, and the median income for a family was $39,624. Males had a median income of $26,846 versus $23,190 for females. The per capita income for the CDP was $15,291. About 8.6% of families and 11.2% of the population were below the poverty line, including 9.1% of those under age 18 and 12.8% of those age 65 or over.

As of 2000, 85.18% spoke Spanish as a first language, and 14.11% spoke English as their first language.

References 

Unincorporated communities in Miami-Dade County, Florida
Census-designated places in Miami-Dade County, Florida
Census-designated places in Florida
Unincorporated communities in Florida